Leopold Sax (died 2 June 1915) was an Austrian footballer. He played in one match for the Austria national football team in 1914.

References

External links
 

Year of birth missing
1915 deaths
Austrian footballers
Austria international footballers
Place of birth missing
Association footballers not categorized by position